Lauren Hobart (born 1969/1970) is an American businesswoman, and has been the CEO of Dick's Sporting Goods since February 2021.

Early life and education
Hobart earned a bachelor's degree from the University of Pennsylvania, and a Master of Business Administration from Stanford University.

Career
Hobart worked for Wells Fargo and JPMorgan Chase, followed by 14 years at PepsiCo. She joined Dick's Sporting Goods in 2011 as senior vice president and chief marketing officer. In 2017, Hobart was appointed president and, in 2018, she joined the board of directors.

In October 2020, Yum! Brands announced the appointment of Hobart as a non-executive director, effective November  2020.

On February 1, 2021, she succeeded Edward W. Stack (son of the founder, Dick Stack) as CEO of Dick's Sporting Goods. She is the first woman to hold this position for the company, which was previously held by members of the Stack family.

References

Living people
American women chief executives
Yum! Brands people
University of Pennsylvania alumni
Stanford University alumni
JPMorgan Chase people
Wells Fargo employees
PepsiCo people
Year of birth missing (living people)
American chief executives of Fortune 500 companies